In mathematics, the term hyperbolic plane may refer to:

 A two-dimensional plane in hyperbolic geometry
 A quadratic space known as the hyperbolic plane (quadratic forms)